The women's 4 × 5 kilometre relay cross-country skiing competition at the 1998 Winter Olympics in Nagano, Japan, was held on 16 February at Snow Harp.

Race summary
Russia had won the last three World Championships, and the 1994 Olympic gold medal, which had been won in 1992 by the Unified Team, and 1988 by the Soviet Union.

Russia and Norway started out quickly, with Nina Gavrylyuk leading over Bente Martinsen, who had a 17.7 lead over third-place Sweden. On the second leg, Norway moved ahead, one second in front of Russia, with Italy back in 12th place. Yelena Välbe, skiing the third leg for Russia, created a gap, and put Russia in front of Norway by 22.8 seconds at the final exchange, with Switzerland another minute behind. Manuela Di Centa skied well for Italy on the third leg but could only move her team up to ninth position. Välbe's split had made it an easy task for Russian anchor Larisa Lazutina, who increased the lead slightly as Russia won a comfortable gold medal over Norway. For Italy, the impossible occurred, as Stefania Belmondo's anchor leg was the fastest of the event, by over 26 seconds, and brought Italy in 1.9 seconds ahead of Switzerland. The podium had Russia, Norway, and Italy, in that order, exactly the same medal finish as in 1994.

Results
Each team used four skiers, with each completing racing over the same 5 kilometre circuit. The first two raced in the classical style, and the final pair of skiers raced freestyle.

References

External links

Women's cross-country skiing at the 1998 Winter Olympics
Women's 4 × 5 kilometre relay cross-country skiing at the Winter Olympics
Oly
Women's events at the 1998 Winter Olympics